Alexander Ernst Alfred Hermann Freiherr von Falkenhausen (29 October 187831 July 1966) was a German general and military advisor to Chiang Kai-shek. He was an important figure during the Sino-German cooperation to reform the Chinese Army. In 1938, Germany ended its support for China under pressure from Japan, and Falkenhausen was forced to return home. Back in Europe, he later became the head of the military government of Belgium from 1940 to 1944 during its German occupation.

Early life and military career 
Alexander von Falkenhausen was born at Blumenthal, near Neisse (now Nysa, Poland) in the Prussian province of Silesia, one of seven children of Baron Alexander von Falkenhausen (1844–1909) and his wife, Elisabeth. He attended a Gymnasium in Breslau (now Wrocław, Poland) and then the cadet school at Wahlstatt (now Legnickie Pole). In his youth, Falkenhausen showed an interest in Eastern Asia and its societies. He travelled and studied in Japan, northern China, Korea and Indochina from 1909 to 1911.

In 1897 he was commissioned as a second lieutenant into the 91st Oldenburg Infantry Regiment of the Imperial German Army, taking part in quelling the Boxer Rebellion, and served as a military attaché in Japan from 1900 up until the First World War. He was awarded the prestigious Pour le Mérite award while serving with the Ottoman Army in Palestine. After the war, he remained in the Reichswehr (German Army) and in 1927 was appointed to head the Dresden Infantry School.

Adviser to Chiang Kai-shek 

In 1930, Falkenhausen retired from the service and in 1934 went to China to serve as Chiang Kai-shek's military advisor, as part of the Sino-German cooperation to reform the Chinese army.  During the reformation, von Falkenhausen was responsible for most of the military training. Original plans by von Seeckt called for a drastic reduction of the military to 60 elite divisions modelled on the Wehrmacht, but questions as to which factions would be axed remained a problem.

Some 80,000 Chinese troops, in eight divisions, were trained and formed the elite of Chiang's army. However, China was not ready to face Japan on equal terms, and Chiang's decision to pit all of his new divisions in the Battle of Shanghai, despite objections from his both staff officers and von Falkenhausen, would cost him one-third of his best troops. Chiang switched his strategy to preserve strength for the eventual civil war.

Von Falkenhausen recommended that Chiang fight a war of attrition as Falkenhausen calculated that Japan could not win a long term war. He suggested that Chiang should hold the Yellow River line, and not attack until later in the war. Also, Chiang should give up a number of provinces in northern China including Shandong. He also recommended to construct a number of fortifications at strategically important locations to slow a Japanese advance. Falkenhausen also advised the Chinese to establish a number of guerrilla operations behind Japanese lines.

In 1937, Nazi Germany allied with the Empire of Japan, which with the Republic of China was fighting the Second Sino-Japanese War. As a goodwill gesture to Japan, Germany recognized the Japanese puppet state of Manchukuo, withdrew German support from China and forced Falkenhausen to resign by threatening to have his family in Germany punished for disloyalty. After a goodbye dinner party with Chiang Kai-shek's family, Falkenhausen promised that he would never reveal any of the battle plans he had devised to the Japanese.

According to some sources (especially from Communist Chinese ones in the late 1930s), Falkenhausen kept in contact with Chiang Kai-shek and occasionally sent European luxury items and food to him, the Chiang household and his officers. On his 72nd birthday in 1950, Falkenhausen received a US$12,000 cheque from Chiang Kai-shek as a birthday gift and a personal note declaring him a "Friend of China".

On his 80th Birthday in 1958, Chinese ambassador to Belgium Wang Xiaoxi awarded Falkenhausen the Grand Cordon of the Order of the Sacred Tripod for his contributions in defending China.

Military governor for Belgium 
Recalled to active duty in 1938, Falkenhausen served as an infantry general on the Western Front, until he was appointed military governor of Belgium in May 1940, the same post his uncle Ludwig von Falkenhausen held 23 years prior during the First World War. Throughout his period of administration, Falkenhausen had co-operated with both Eggert Reeder and Dr. Werner Best, to try to apply the rules of the Hague Convention in their region, often against the wishes and instructions of their Wehrmacht and SS superiors.

Though opposed to Nazi extremism towards the Jewish population, he yielded to pressure from Reinhard Heydrich's RSHA, leading in June 1942 to the deportation of 28,900 Jews. His deputy for economic affairs, Eggert Reeder, was in charge of the destruction of "Jewish influence" in the Belgian economy, leading to mass unemployment of Jewish workers, especially in the diamond business. While implementation of economic policy led to mass unemployment of Belgian Jewish workers, Reeder's efforts preserved existing national administrative structures and business relations within Belgium and northern France during the German occupation. 2,250 of these unemployed Belgian Jews were sent to forced labor camps in Northern France, in order to build the Atlantic Wall for Organisation Todt.

To ensure that all the Belgian people co-operated in the German occupation, Reeder negotiated an agreement to allow native Belgian Jews to remain in Belgium. Part of this was the non-enforcement of the Reich Security Main Office order for all Jews to be marked by wearing a yellow Star of David at all times, until Helmut Knochen's conference in Paris on 14 March 1942.

He intervened twice to prevent the execution of Belgians for resistance against the Germans, at the request of Qian Xiuling, a Chinese-Belgian woman whose elder cousin, Lieutenant General Qian Zhuolun, was a good friend of Falkenhausen during his time in China and in the post-war trial Qian Xiuling spoke in his defense, saying: "Nothing I did could have been accomplished without General von Falkenhausen's help. Even though he might not deserve an award, neither should he be put on trial, definitely not."

Bomb plot 
Falkenhausen was a close friend of the anti-Hitler conspirators, Carl Friedrich Goerdeler and Field Marshal Erwin von Witzleben and soon came to detest Adolf Hitler and the Nazi regime. He offered his support to Witzleben for a planned coup d'état against Hitler, but did not take any part in the coup. After the failure of the 20 July Plot to kill Hitler in 1944, Falkenhausen was relieved of his command and later arrested.  Falkenhausen spent the rest of the war being transferred from one concentration camp to another. In late April 1945 he was transferred to Tyrol with about 140 other prominent inmates of the Dachau concentration camp.

The SS fled, leaving the prisoners behind and he was captured by the Fifth U.S. Army on 5 May 1945.

Trial and pardon 
Falkenhausen and Reeder were sent to Belgium for trial in 1948, where they were held on remand for three years. A trial for their role in the deportation of Jews from Belgium but not for their deaths in Auschwitz, began in Brussels on 9 March 1951 and they were defended by the lawyer Ernst Achenbach.

During the trial, Falkenhausen was vouched for by Qian Xiuling, former French Prime Minister Léon Blum and a number of Belgian Jews, who gave evidence that Falkenhausen and Reeder had tried to save Belgian and Jewish lives. Nevertheless, on 9 July 1951 they were convicted and sentenced to twelve years hard labour in Germany. On their return to West Germany three weeks after the end of the trial, having served one third of their sentence, as required by Belgian law, they were pardoned by Chancellor Konrad Adenauer.

Later life 
On return to Germany, he first lived near the then inner German border on the estate of his friend Franz von Papen and then, fearing kidnapping by East German agents, in Nassau an der Lahn.

In 1950, Falkenhausen became a widower; in 1960 he married his second wife, Cécile Vent (1906–1977), who had been a Belgian resistance fighter.  He had met her during his imprisonment in 1948, when Vent was a member of the administrative commission of the prisons of Verviers.

Dates of rank 
 Sekondeleutnant, March 1897
 Leutnant, January 1899
 Hauptmann, March 1910
 Major, March 1915
 Lieutenant Colonel, Ottoman Army, June 1916
 Oberstleutnant, Imperial German Army, December 1920
 Oberst, April 1924
 Generalmajor, April 1928
 Generalleutnant, October 1929
 General der Infanterie, September 1940

Decorations and awards 
 Pour le Mérite (Prussia) 7 May 1918
 Order of the Crown, 4th class with Swords (Prussia)
 Knight's Cross of the Friedrich Order, 2nd class with Swords (Württemberg)
 Iron Cross of 1914, 1st and 2nd class
 Knight's Cross of the Royal House Order of Hohenzollern with Swords [7]
 Knight of Honour of the Order of Saint John (Bailiwick of Brandenburg)
 Service Award (Prussia)
 Military Merit Order, 3rd class with Swords (Bavaria)
 Knight's Cross of the Order of the Crown with Swords (Württemberg)
 Honorary Knight's Cross, First Class of the House and Merit Order of Peter Frederick Louis with swords and laurel (Oldenburg)
 Friedrich August Cross, 1st and 2nd class (Oldenburg)
 Bravery Medal (Hesse)
 Hanseatic Cross (Hamburg)
 Order of the Iron Crown, 3rd class with War Decoration (Austria)
 Military Merit Cross, 3rd class with War Decoration  (Austria-Hungary)
 Order of Osmanieh, 3rd class with sabre (Ottoman Empire)
 Order of the Medjidie, 2nd class with swords (Ottoman Empire)
 Imtiyaz Medal in Silver with Sabres (Ottoman Empire)
 Liakat Medal in Gold with sabre (Ottoman Empire)
 Gallipoli Star ("Iron Crescent", Ottoman Empire)
 Wehrmacht Long Service Award
 War Merit Cross, 1st and 2nd class with Swords (1939)
 German Cross in Silver (20 April 1943)
 Order of the Sacred Tripod, Special Grand Cordon (China) on 28 November 1958

References

External links 

 Personal Bio and Military achievement of Falkenhausen
 More tidbit info on Falkenhausen in Axis forum
 

Prussian Army personnel
Alexander
Protestants in the German Resistance
Members of the 20 July plot
Holocaust perpetrators in Belgium
German occupation of Belgium during World War II
German military personnel of the Boxer Rebellion
People from the Province of Silesia
Recipients of the Order of the Medjidie, 2nd class
Recipients of the Silver Imtiyaz Medal
Recipients of the Gold Liakat Medal
German conservatives in the German Resistance
1878 births
1966 deaths
Dachau concentration camp survivors
Barons of Germany
Ottoman military personnel of World War I
Lieutenant generals of the Reichswehr
German Army generals of World War II
Generals of Infantry (Wehrmacht)
German military attachés
Recipients of the Pour le Mérite (military class)
Recipients of the Order of the Sacred Tripod